were officials of the Tokugawa shogunate in Edo period Japan.

This bakufu title identifies an official with responsibility for superintending all mines,  mining and metals-extraction activities in Japan.

List of kinzan-bugyō

 Kakizaki Sakuzaemon

See also
 Bugyō
 Kinza – Gold za (monopoly office or guild).
 Ginza – Silver za (monopoly office or guild).
 Dōza – Copper za (monopoly office or guild).

Notes

References
 Hall, John Wesley. (1955).  Tanuma Okitsugu: Forerunner of Modern Japan. Cambridge: Harvard University Press.
 Walker, Brett L. (2001).  The Conquest of Ainu Lands: Ecology and Culture in Japanese Expansion, 1590–1800. Berkeley: University of California Press. 

Government of feudal Japan
Officials of the Tokugawa shogunate
Mining in Japan